Parasia is a town in the Indian state of West Bengal.

Parasia may also refers to:
 Dongar Parasia, town, municipality and tehsil in Chhindwara district, Madhya Pradesh, India
 Parasiya, village in Tonk district, Rajasthan, India